The Latin Mass Society of Ireland (LMSI), founded in 1999, is a Roman Catholic society based in Ireland that is dedicated to the preservation of the Tridentine Mass as one of the forms of the Church's liturgy and to making it more widely available. The Society is composed predominantly of lay members and is headed by Nick Lowry. It also includes a number of priests who wish to minister to those who request access to the sacraments in the 1962 form. Its Chaplain is the Very Rev. Michael Cahill of the Meath Diocese.

The Latin Mass Society of Ireland works at promoting the traditional Mass through pilgrimages, Masses and in the press.  Its favoured means of communication include its website and an occasional newsletter entitled Traditio Viva.

See also 
Tridentine Mass
Summorum Pontificum
Ecclesia Dei
Association for Latin Liturgy

External links 
The Latin Mass Society of Ireland Official síte

Ecclesia Dei
Catholic Church in Ireland
Christian organizations established in 1999
1999 establishments in Ireland